Jön az öcsém (My Brother is Coming, literally "my younger brother is coming") is a 1919 short Hungarian drama film directed by Michael Curtiz.

Cast
 Oscar Beregi Sr. as The younger brother (as Oszkár Beregi)
 Lucy Doraine as The woman (as Ilonka Kovács)
 József Kürthy as The elder brother
 Ferenc Szécsi as The kid (as Ferkó Szécsi)

See also
 Michael Curtiz filmography

External links
Watch Jön az öcsém at Europa Film Treasures

1919 films
1919 short films
1919 drama films
Films directed by Michael Curtiz
Hungarian black-and-white films
Hungarian silent short films
Hungarian drama films
Silent drama films